The 1987 CART PPG Indy Car World Series season was the 9th national championship season of American open wheel racing sanctioned by CART. The season consisted of 16 races, and one non-points exhibition event. Bobby Rahal was the national champion, winning his second-consecutive title. The rookie of the year was Fabrizio Barbazza. The 1987 Indianapolis 500 was sanctioned by USAC, but counted towards the CART points championship. Al Unser won the Indy 500, his record-tying fourth victory at Indy.

Defending series champion and defending Indy 500 winner Bobby Rahal and his Truesports team made a highly publicized switch from the March chassis to the up-and-coming Lola chassis. Truesports, however, stayed with the proven Cosworth engine. For 1987, the Ilmor Chevrolet Indy V-8 expanded its participation, fielding cars with Penske Racing, Newman/Haas and Patrick. Mario Andretti scored the engine's first Indy car victory in the season opener at Long Beach. Also joining the series full-time was the Judd AV V-8 (badged initially as the Brabham-Honda), and later in the season Porsche made their Indy car debut. Penske resumed their in-house chassis program, but after dismal results with the PC-16, the cars were parked during practice at Indy in favor of the March 86C.

Roberto Guerrero won the second race of the season (Phoenix), starting from last position on the grid due to failing post qualifying inspection. Mario Andretti dominated the Indianapolis 500, leading 171 of the first 177 laps, but dropped out with engine failure with only 23 laps to go. Guerrero took the lead, but stalled during his final pit stop. Al Unser led the final 18 laps to win, one of the biggest upsets in Indy 500 history. Though Guerrero faltered at Indy, he would be a factor through most of the season. After winning at Mid-Ohio in September he was third in points. However he was sidelined with serious head injuries due to a testing crash at the Indianapolis Motor Speedway and was in a coma for seventeen days, missing the remainder of the season. 

For the second year in a row, the championship battle came down to Bobby Rahal and Michael Andretti. Rahal took the points lead after back-to-back wins at Portland and the Meadowlands. Andretti won the Michigan 500, and drew within 9 points of Rahal. At Mid-Ohio, Rahal was dominating until he tangled with a backmarker. Andretti had a chance to make up ground in the points, but blew his engine two laps later.

Michael Andretti rebounded, winning in dominating fashion at the inaugural race at Nazareth. But Rahal charged to finish second, and with two races left, held a 25-point lead. In the next-to-last race of the season at Laguna Seca, Andretti dropped out with alternator trouble, and Rahal mathematically clinched the championship. It was Rahal's second-consecutive CART title, and Michael Andretti finished runner-up in points for the second year in a row.

Teams and drivers
The following teams and drivers competed in the 1987 Indy Car World Series season.  All cars used Goodyear tires.

Notes
(R) – Rookie
1. Crawford was injured on Pole Day, and replaced by Johncock.
2. All three drivers listed as entries at Miami.
3. Curb used March 86C Chassis at round 3 only.
4. Coyne used a Cosworth engine at round 7 only.
5. Richards used a Lola T8700 at round 6 only.
6. MacPherson used a Lola T8600 at rounds 11 and 12 only, and used Cosworth at rounds 10, 13-15 only.
7. Goodyear used a March 86C at round 7 only.
8. Ongais practiced at round 3 with a PC-16/Chevy A combo, but did not attempt to qualify due to injury.
9. Miaskiewicz used a March 87C at round 7 only.
10. Sullivan used a PC-16 at rounds 1-2, 5-6 only while he used a March 86C at the other rounds.
11. Mears used a PC-16 at rounds 1-2, 5-8 only while he used a March 86C at the other rounds.

Season Summary

Schedule
There would only be one race at Phoenix International Raceway and Michigan International Speedway from this season forward. Additionally Pennsylvania International Raceway had been paved and added to the schedule as a 200 mile event for the first time.

- Miami was supposed to run for 200 miles (322 kilometers) but was shortened due to rain.
 Oval/Speedway
 Dedicated road course
 Temporary street circuit
NC Non-championship event
Indianapolis was USAC-sanctioned but counted towards the CART title.

Race summaries

Long Beach
Mario Andretti started on the pole position and dominated the Long Beach Grand Prix, his third win in four years at the circuit. It marked the first-ever victory in Indy car competition for the Ilmor Chevrolet Indy V-8 engine. Emerson Fittipaldi was a close second until he dropped out with turbocharger failure.

Phoenix
Roberto Guerrero qualified third, but failed post-qualifying inspection for being 2.5 pounds underweight. He was forced to start last on the grid. Guerrero quickly charged through the field, and was in the top five by lap 46. He dueled with Bobby Rahal for the lead on lap 62, and dominated the second half. Even a stop-and-go penalty for hitting a tire in the pits did not slow Guerrero's run.

Guerrero won by 8 seconds over Rahal, becoming only the fourth driver in modern Indy car history to win a race from the last starting position.

Indianapolis 500
Mario Andretti dominated the entire month of May at Indy. He ran the fastest practice laps, won the pole position, the pit stop contest, and led 170 of the first 177 laps. With only 23 laps to go, Andretti suddenly slowed with a broken valve spring which led to fueling and engine failure. Roberto Guerrero, the winner at Phoenix, stalled in the pits while leading due to a failing clutch, and came home second while Al Unser, who had entered the month without a ride took the lead with 18 laps to go, and recorded one of the biggest upsets in Indy history.

Milwaukee
While leading the race on lap 149, Mario Andretti broke a rear wing, sending the car hard into the outside and inside walls. He was taken to the hospital with relatively minor injuries. Mario's son Michael Andretti took the lead after the accident, locked in a duel with Roberto Guerrero.

On lap 177, Guerrero suddenly blew his engine, leaving Michael Andretti in the lead. A late-race caution allowed Bobby Rahal to close the gap, but Michael held on for the victory. Rahal finished second.

Portland
Bobby Rahal won his first race of the season, passing Michael Andretti for the lead on lap 70 of 104. Rahal built up a 22-second lead late in the race, but slowed to conserve fuel over the final 10 laps. Andretti closed to within 6 seconds, but managed only second place.

Meadowlands
Bobby Rahal made it back-to-back victories, winning for the second time of the season at the Meadowlands. Rahal also took over the points lead.

Cleveland
Emerson Fittipaldi and Bobby Rahal pitted for the final time on lap 53, both hoping to stretch their fuel to the finish. Fittipaldi pulled out to an 18-second lead, and despite the fuel light flashing over the final five laps, held on to win his first race of the season.

Rahal finished a strong second, and increased his lead in the points standings.

Toronto
Emerson Fittipaldi looked to win his second race in a row, but a final lap mishap almost cost him the race. With Danny Sullivan running second on the final lap, Fittipaldi led by about 4 seconds at the white flag. Down the Lake Shore Drive backstretch on the final lap, however, Fittipaldi became mired in traffic. Through the hairpin, the track was essentially blocked by three backmarkers, which allowed Sullivan to dramatically close the gap. With two turns to go, Sullivan dove below Fittipaldi for the lead, but the two cars touched wheels. Fittipaldi's car stayed straight, but Sullivan spun out.

Fittipaldi went on to win, while Sullivan limped across the finish line to hold on to second. Bobby Rahal came home third and padded his championship lead.

Michigan 500
Just as at Indianapolis, Mario Andretti dominated the race. Taking the lead on lap 43, he led the next 114 laps and had a 1 lap lead on his son Michael, in second place, and a 2 lap lead on the rest of the field. But, just as at Indianapolis, his engine blew on lap 156, ending his day.

With 8 laps to go, Michael Andretti led Indy 500 winner Al Unser and Bobby Rahal. Andretti needed to make his final pit stop, but a faulty clutch nearly cost him dearly. Andretti's car sputtered and nearly stalled as he pulled away, and he lost several seconds.

Back on the track, Michael maintained a 9-second lead to the finish, with Unser finishing second. Third place Rahal maintained a 9-point advantage over Michael in the points championship.

Pocono 500
Mario Andretti started from the pole and led 22 laps, but gets too low in turn one on lap 89, and crashed hard into the outside wall. He suffers a separated shoulder, his second injury of the season. The rough apron of turn one was stained by lime, which caused Andretti's car to lose traction.

Rick Mears, who had not won a race in two years, led Geoff Brabham late in the race, but was low on fuel. Mears' car sputtered on the final lap, but he crossed the line under power to take the victory. It was the first 500-mile race victory for the Ilmor Chevy Indy V-8 engine. Brabham, meanwhile, scored a career-best second place, and the best finish yet for the new Brabham-Honda engine. Roberto Guerrero, who led with 17 laps to go, dropped to third when he was forced to pit for fuel five laps from the end.

Points leader Bobby Rahal came home 5th, and maintained a championship lead of 14 points over Michael Andretti.

Road America
After four months of disappointments and injuries, Mario Andretti finally found the winner's circle for the first time since the season opener. Despite recovering from a separated shoulder, Andretti won the pole and dominated the race wire-to-wire, leading all 50 laps. Geoff Brabham scored his second runner-up finish in a row.

The top two drivers in the points standings, Bobby Rahal and Michael Andretti, both finished out of the points.

Mid-Ohio
Bobby Rahal was leading by half a lap and looking for his third consecutive victory at Mid-Ohio. With about 12 laps to go, however, Rahal tangled with the lapped car of Rick Miaskiewicz, forcing him to pit with a punctured tire.

Roberto Guerrero blew by the limping car of Rahal to take the lead on lap 74, and Michael Andretti swept into second. Andretti had a golden opportunity to make up ground in the championship hunt, but a few laps later, blew his engine. Rahal climbed back up to second, while Guerrero won his second race of the season.

Four days later, Guerrero would be injured during a tire test at Indianapolis. He was struck in the head by a tire, leaving him in a coma, and sidelined for the remainder of the season.

Nazareth
CART made its debut at the newly reconstructed Pennsylvania International Raceway in Nazareth. Hometown driver Michael Andretti led 150 laps, looking to make up as much ground as possible in the championship hunt against Bobby Rahal.

Al Unser drove substitution for the injured Roberto Guerrero, charging to as high as second place late in the race. With seven laps to go, Unser touched wheels with Jeff MacPherson, and smacked the outside wall coming out of turn 4. Rahal, who had lost a lap after nearly stalling in the pits, moved up to second at the checkered flag. With two races remaining, Rahal held a 25-point lead.

Laguna Seca
With the championship down to two drivers, Bobby Rahal and Michael Andretti, Rahal needed to finish the final two races to hold on to his second-consecutive CART title. Rahal had won the Laguna Seca event three years in a row, going for four.

When Michael Andretti dropped out on lap 36 with alternator trouble, Rahal clinched the championship title, regardless of his finish at the final race in Miami. Later in the race, Mario Andretti dropped out, enabling Rahal to take the lead and win at Laguna Seca for a record fourth year in a row. Rahal celebrated in victory lane both the race win and the CART championship title.

Also making news at Laguna Seca was the debut of the Porsche Indy car team led by Al Holbert. A week after substituting for Roberto Guerrero, Al Unser was back on the track in another car, this time behind the wheel of the new Porsche. The effort started out on a sour note, however. The car was slow and dropped out after only seven laps with a broken water pump. It would be Unser's lone race with the team, and the only event the chassis would race. The following year the Porsche team would switch to March chassis.

Tamiami Park
With the championship title already decided, Michael Andretti dominated en route to victory, but still finished second in the points standings.

Rahal, who had won the exhibition Marlboro Challenge a day earlier, finished 7th.

Race results

Driver Standings

References

See also
 1987 Indianapolis 500
 1987 American Racing Series season

Champ Car seasons
IndyCar